Her Reputation is a 1931 British comedy film directed by Sidney Morgan and starring Iris Hoey, Frank Cellier and Lillian Hall-Davis. It was based on the play Passing Brompton Road by Jevan Brandon-Thomas. It was made at British and Dominions Elstree Studios as a quota quickie for distribution by Paramount British Pictures.

Synopsis
A woman plans to boost her public profile by getting a divorce and enlists the help of a male friend to act as co-respondent. This leads to a series of mix-ups and her eventual decision not to get divorced.

Cast
 Iris Hoey as Dultitia Sloane
 Frank Cellier as Henry Sloane
 Malcolm Tearle as George Harding
 Lillian Hall-Davis as Carruthers
 Maurice Braddell as Eric Sloane
 Joan Morgan as Veronica Sloane
 Dorothy Black as Georgina Pastell
 Laurence Hanray as Mr. Montgomery

References

External links

1931 films
1931 comedy films
British films based on plays
Films directed by Sidney Morgan
British comedy films
British black-and-white films
Films shot at Imperial Studios, Elstree
Paramount Pictures films
Quota quickies
1930s English-language films
1930s British films